Michele Jeanne Sison (born May 27, 1959, in Arlington, Virginia) is an American diplomat and career member of the Senior Foreign Service serving as the assistant secretary of state for international organization affairs. She has previously served in various other diplomatic posts around the world on behalf of the United States, including ambassador to Haiti. Sison holds the personal rank of career ambassador.

Early life and education
Sison earned her bachelor of arts in political science from Wellesley College, and also studied at the London School of Economics.

Career 

Sison's overseas assignments have included service as deputy chief of mission and chargé d'affaires at the U.S. embassy in Islamabad, Pakistan (1999–2002) and as consul general at the U.S. consulate general in Chennai, India (1996–1999). She also served at the U.S. missions in Abidjan, Côte d'Ivoire (1993–1996); Douala, Cameroon (1991–1993); Cotonou, Benin (1988–1991); Lomé, Togo (1984–1988); and Port-au-Prince, Haiti (1982–1984), as well as in Washington. Ambassador Sison is the recipient of numerous U.S. Department of State awards for exceptional service.

She was confirmed by the U.S. Senate as United States ambassador to the United Arab Emirates on May 6, 2004, and sworn in by Secretary of State Colin Powell on July 12, 2004. Prior to her appointment to the UAE, she served as Principal Deputy Assistant Secretary in the Bureau of South Asian Affairs, charged with providing broad policy oversight of U.S. relations with Pakistan, Afghanistan, Bangladesh, India, Nepal, and Sri Lanka.

She also had a short stint as the U.S. Chargés d'affaires a.i. in Lebanon, before her Senate confirmation as U.S. Ambassador to Lebanon on August 1, 2008. Sison's assignment in Lebanon ended in August 2010.

She was confirmed by the U.S. Senate on June 29, 2012, as U.S. Ambassador to Sri Lanka and the Maldives.

On July 8, 2014, President Barack Obama announced the nomination of Sison as Deputy Representative of the United States to the United Nations, with the rank of Ambassador, and Deputy Representative of the United States in the Security Council of the United Nations. She was confirmed by the Senate in a voice vote on November 19, 2014.

Ambassador to Haiti

On November 2, 2017, she was confirmed by the Senate to serve as the United States Ambassador to Haiti, having been nominated by U.S. President Donald Trump. Among the major issues facing her in her role were navigating a response by the United Nations to victims of a cholera epidemic the organization started in October 2010. She was also confronted with the U.S. government's decision on whether or not to extend Temporary Protected Status to Haitian immigrants who were in the U.S. at the time of the massive earthquake in Port-au-Prince in January 2010.

In 2018, Sison was promoted to the personal rank of Career Ambassador, the highest personal rank in the Senior Foreign Service, given for exceptionally distinguished service over a prolonged period of time.

Sison left the post on October 9, 2021, and was succeeded by Chargé d’Affaires, a.i., Kenneth H. Merten.

Assistant Secretary of State for International Organization Affairs

On April 15, 2021, Sison was nominated by President Biden to serve as Assistant Secretary of State for International Organization Affairs. Sison's nomination was reported favorably on June 24, 2021, by the Senate's Foreign Relations Committee. She was confirmed to the position by the Senate on December 18, 2021, by voice vote, and she was sworn in on December 21, 2021.

Personal life
Sison speaks fluent French and basic Haitian Creole and Arabic. She has two daughters. Her father is originally from the Philippines.

References

External links

Michele J. Sison Biography at the U.S. Embassy in Haiti

|-

|-

|-

|-

|-

|-

1959 births
Living people
Ambassadors of the United States to Lebanon
Ambassadors of the United States to the United Arab Emirates
Ambassadors of the United States to Haiti
American people of Filipino descent
People from Arlington County, Virginia
Permanent Representatives of the United States to the United Nations
Trump administration cabinet members
Wellesley College alumni
United States Foreign Service personnel
United States Career Ambassadors
21st-century American diplomats
American women ambassadors
21st-century American women
American women diplomats
Biden administration personnel